Walter Traill Dennison (1825–1894) was a farmer and folklorist.  He was a native of the Orkney island of Sanday, in Scotland, where he collected local folk tales and other antiquites.  Dennison recorded most of the information available about traditional tales told in Orkney, but to an extent "romanticised and systematised" parts of it in the process of transforming the stories into prose. Writing in 2004 and 2010 twenty-first century academics from the University of the Highlands and Islands and University of Glasgow indicate Traill Dennison "relied almost exclusively on the peasantry of his native island for the raw materials of his literary work" and he "provided us with some authentic traditions and that he got these, as he always claimed, directly from the Orkney peasantry". The Orcadian folklorist and antiquarian Ernest Marwick considered that Traill Dennison bridged the gap between the social classes and that he had an "affinity with the common people".

Traill Dennison published the folk stories, many in the local Orcadian dialect, in 1880 under the title The Orcadian Sketch-Book (William Peace & Son, Kirkwall).  Also author of the ten Sanday Revival Hymns (published anonymously, 1861, Edinburgh).

Married with one daughter, he died on 3 September 1894 after a short illness.

References

Bibliography 

1825 births
1894 deaths
People from Orkney
Scottish folklorists
19th-century Scottish farmers
Scottish songwriters
Scottish non-fiction writers
19th-century Scottish writers
Victorian writers